The Revenge of Ivanhoe is a 1965 Italian adventure film directed by Tanio Boccia.

Cast
 Rik Van Nutter(credited as Clyde Rogers) as Ivanhoe 
 Gilda Lousek as Rowena of Stratford
 Andrea Aureli as Bertrand of Hastings
 Duilio Marzio as Cedric of Hastings
 Glauco Onorato as Lockheel
 Furio Meniconi as Etimbaldo
 Nando Tamberlani as Prior of Wessex 
 Tullio Altamura as Wilfred Cox 
 Nerio Bernardi as Donald, Dungeon master

External links
 

1965 films
1960s Italian-language films
Films directed by Tanio Boccia
Films based on Ivanhoe
Italian swashbuckler films
1965 adventure films
1960s Italian films